Praeclara gratulationis publicae (Splendid testimonies of public [rejoicing]) is an apostolic letter of Pope Leo XIII promulgated on 20 June 1894.

Content
It called for the reunion of Eastern and Western churches into the "Unity of the Faith". It also condemned Freemasonry. A previous letter on the same subject, entitled the epistle to the Easterners, had been written by Pope Pius IX in 1848.

Reactions and legacy
In 1895, it was criticized by Ecumenical Patriarch Anthimus VII.

The call for unity was re-asserted by the Second Vatican Council's Unitatis redintegratio, although the latter statement articulates a different kind of ecclesiology that is more in line with the Council's spirit of cooperation with fellow Christians.

Praeclara was cited in the encyclical Orientales omnes Ecclesias of Pope Pius XII on the topic of Eastern Catholic Churches.

Leo XIII has also been criticized by Protestant fundamentalists for having declared in the encyclical that "We hold upon this earth the place of God Almighty", which was seen as a sign of the coming apocalypse.

See also
 In Suprema Petri Apostoli Sede
Papal ban of Freemasonry
 East–West Schism
 List of encyclicals of Pope Leo XIII
 Papal documents relating to Freemasonry

References

External links

 Text of Praeclara gratulationis publicae

Catholicism and Freemasonry
Catholic Church and ecumenism
1894 documents
1894 in Christianity
June 1894 events
Apostolic letters of Pope Leo XIII